The Valdivia Fracture Zone (VFZ) is a transform fault zone off the coast of southern Chile which runs between the continental slope near Valdivia in Chile and the Panov Seamount crossing the Chile Ridge.

References

Fracture zones
Seismic faults of Chile